Sömmerda II is an electoral constituency (German: Wahlkreis) represented in the Landtag of Thuringia. It elects one member via first-past-the-post voting. Under the current constituency numbering system, it is designated as constituency 17. It covers most of the Sömmerda district, including the city of Sömmerda.

Sömmerda II was created for the 1994 state election. Since 2019, it has been represented by Torsten Czuppon of Alternative for Germany (AfD).

Geography
As of the 2019 state election, Sömmerda II covers most of the Sömmerda district, specifically the municipalities of Alperstedt, Büchel, Buttstädt, Eckstedt, Griefstedt, Großmölsen, Großneuhausen, Großrudestedt, Günstedt, Kindelbrück, Kleinmölsen, Kleinneuhausen, Kölleda, Markvippach, Nöda, Ollendorf, Ostramondra, Rastenberg, Riethgen, Schloßvippach, Sömmerda, Sprötau, Udestedt, Vogelsberg, and Weißensee.

Members
The constituency was held by the Christian Democratic Union (CDU) from its creation in 1994 until 2019, during which time it was represented by Dietmar Werner (1994–1999) and Christian Carius (1999–2019). It was won by Alternative for Germany in 2019, and is represented by Torsten Czuppon.

Election results

2019 election

2014 election

2009 election

2004 election

1999 election

1994 election

References

Electoral districts in Thuringia
1994 establishments in Germany
Sömmerda (district)
Constituencies established in 1994